Dodge is an unincorporated census-designated place located in the town of Dodge, Trempealeau County, Wisconsin, United States. Dodge has a post office with ZIP code 54625. As of the 2010 census, its population was 121.

References

Census-designated places in Trempealeau County, Wisconsin
Census-designated places in Wisconsin